Serhiy Oleksandrovych Krasyuk (also Sergey; ; 17 November 1961 – July 1994) was a Ukrainian swimmer. He won a gold and silver medal at the 1980 Summer Olympics in the 4 × 100 m medley and 4 × 200 m freestyle relays, respectively; in both events he swam for the Soviet Unions team in the preliminary rounds. Individually he finished in sixth place in the 100 m freestyle. After the Olympics he won several medals at the world and European championships. He missed the 1984 Summer Olympics due to their boycott by the Soviet Union and competed in the Friendship Games instead, winning a gold, silver and bronze medal.

References

1961 births
Living people
Ukrainian male swimmers
Ukrainian male freestyle swimmers
Olympic swimmers of the Soviet Union
Swimmers at the 1980 Summer Olympics
Soviet male swimmers
World Aquatics Championships medalists in swimming
European Aquatics Championships medalists in swimming
Sportspeople from Kyiv
Medalists at the 1980 Summer Olympics
Olympic gold medalists for the Soviet Union
Olympic silver medalists for the Soviet Union
Universiade medalists in swimming
Universiade gold medalists for the Soviet Union
Universiade silver medalists for the Soviet Union
Medalists at the 1981 Summer Universiade